Novaya Mikhaylovka is a rural locality (a village) in Maloyazovsky Selsoviet, Salavatsky District, Bashkortostan, Russia. The population was 7 as of 2010. There is 1 street.

Geography 
Novaya Mikhaylovka is located 5 km west of Maloyaz (the district's administrative centre) by road. Maloyaz is the nearest rural locality.

References 

Rural localities in Salavatsky District